Manifold Data Mining Inc. is a Canadian company specializing in consumer data products, analytics, and predictive modeling. As a data and analytical service provider in Canada, they have been providing businesses, charities, and governmental organizations with comprehensive data products since being founded in 2001. For each neighbourhood, they provide estimates of what products consumers buy, where and how often they shop, how much they spend, which media channels they use, their lifestyles, and their attitudes or psychographics.

Data Products 
Their data products include demographics (e.g. geo-demographics), consumer behaviour, and a number of other categories. The Canadian census is conducted every 5 years, so in order to produce inter-censal estimates, e.g. for Sault Ste. Marie, they need to take into consideration other factors. They also consider factors which affect the standard census such as undercount.

All data products are modelled down to the 6-digit postal code level and various levels of census geographic units, with each postal code averaging 10–15 households.

Manifold is a partner of Vividata and Numeris, and models their survey responses down to the 6-digit postal code level, i.e. all across Canada and in markets not covered by their surveys.

CanaCode Lifestyle Clusters 
One of their popular data products is CanaCode Lifestyles, which is a lifestyle segmentation system based on over 10,000 variables, ranging from demographic to spending to consumer behaviour and media usage patterns.

Scientific Research 
Manifold Data Mining has also published numerous peer-reviewed research papers on topics such as Type 2 Diabetes. Manifold also publishes papers on Machine Learning techniques like collaborative filtering, which they use in their modelling and as part of their proprietary techniques.

Other Usage 
Manifold is often cited by municipalities in their community profiles, 5 and 10 year economic and land development plans.

Manifold's data has been used by university researchers, for example those investigating poverty odds, living standards, and low socio-economic status.

References

External links
 Manifold Data Mining Inc.

2001 establishments in Ontario
Publishing in Canada
Market research companies of Canada
Business services companies established in 2001
Geomarketing
Business intelligence companies
Marketing analytics
Market research